The CAF Cup was a seasonal association football competition established in 1992 and abolished and merged with the African Cup Winners' Cup to form the CAF Confederations Cup in 2004. The CAF Cup was open to the domestic leagues runners-up of member associations who have not qualified to one of the two pre-existing CAF international club competitions the African Cup of Champions Clubs or the African Cup Winners' Cup.

List of finals

 The "Year" column refers to the season the competition was held, and wikilinks to the article about that season.
 Finals are listed in the order they were played.

Performances

By club

By country

Notes & references

Notes

References

External links
CAF Cup - Rec.Sport.Soccer Statistics Foundation

finals
CAF Cup